Montmorency was an electoral district of the Legislative Assembly of the Parliament of the Province of Canada, in Canada East, near Quebec City.  It was created in 1841 by the merger of two electoral districts from the former Legislative Assembly of Lower Canada, Montmorency and Orleans. It was represented by one member in the Legislative Assembly. 

The electoral district was abolished in 1867, upon the creation of Canada and the province of Quebec.

Boundaries 

The Union Act, 1840 merged the two provinces of Upper Canada and Lower Canada into the Province of Canada, with a single Parliament.  The separate parliaments of Lower Canada and Upper Canada were abolished.Union Act, 1840, 3 & 4 Vict., c. 35, s. 2. 

The Union Act provided that while many of the pre-existing electoral boundaries of Lower Canada and Upper Canada would continue to be used in the new Parliament, some electoral districts would be defined directly by the Union Act itself.  Montmorency was one of those new electoral districts. The Union Act merged the previous electoral districts of the Montmorency and Orleans, to create a new district, also called Montmorency.

The former district of Montmorency had been defined by the 1829 boundaries as follows:

The former district of Orleans had been defined as follows:

The merger of the two districts resulted in the new electoral district of Montmorency stretching from the island of Orleans in the Saint Lawrence to the north-east of Quebec City (now in the Capitale-Nationale région).

Members of the Legislative Assembly 

Montmorency was represented by one member in the Legislative Assembly.

The following were the members of the Legislative Assembly from Montmorency.

Abolition 

The district was abolished on July 1, 1867, when the British North America Act, 1867 came into force, splitting the Province of Canada into Quebec and Ontario.  It was succeeded by electoral districts of the same name in the House of Commons of Canada and the Legislative Assembly of Quebec.

References 

Electoral districts of Canada East